The Mighty Boosh's third series was originally broadcast between 15 November 2007 and 20 December 2007. The series features five main cast members; Julian Barratt, Noel Fielding, Rich Fulcher, Michael Fielding and Dave Brown. The third series revolves around Howard Moon and Vince Noir (Julian Barratt and Noel Fielding), and the adventures they have whilst running a second-hand shop. A DVD of the series was released on 11 February 2008 in Region 2 and 7 August in Region 4.

Overview

Setting
Whereas the second series was set mainly in a flat in Dalston, England, the third series was set in a second hand shop below the flat called the Nabootique, owned by Naboo, and run by Howard Moon and Vince Noir. The flat, however, is re-used for most of the setting of the episode "Party".

Production
Series 3 had the smallest budget of all three series to date. Filming for the series took place in seven weeks, from July to September 2007, in a warehouse in a disused Ministry of Defence site in Surrey, England. The reason the show was on a two-year break was because there was a 55 performance live tour happening in 2006.

Reception
The first episode, "Eels", attracted 1 million viewers, making it the most-watched programme in BBC3's history.

Episodes

{| class="wikitable plainrowheaders" border="1" style="width:100%;"
|-
! style="background:#5B2C62; color:#ffffff; width:5%;"| No. inseries
! style="background:#5B2C62; color:#ffffff; width:5%;"| No. inseason
! style="background:#5B2C62; color:#ffffff;"| Title
! style="background:#5B2C62; color:#ffffff;"| Directed by
! style="background:#5B2C62; color:#ffffff; width:25%;"| Original air date

|}

Notes

External links
 Series 3 at the BBC

The Mighty Boosh series
2007 British television seasons